The Ministry of Culture and National Heritage is a ministry within Polish government led by the Minister of Culture and National Heritage responsible for national heritage preservation and Polish culture promotion. Ministry oversees state or partially state cultural institutions and implements the law regarding art and cultural property. Ministry headquarters are located at Potocki Palace, 15 Krakowskie Przedmieście Street in Warsaw. Incumbent minister has been Piotr Gliński (Deputy Prime Minister, member of the Cabinet) since November 2015.

History 
It was formed on 31 October 2005, from transformation of Ministry of Culture of the Republic of Poland. The ministry can trace its history back to 1918 when the Ministry of Art and Culture was established. It was suppressed in 1922 due to rationalization of public expense and structural reform of the government. It was reestablished within the temporary communist government in 1944 and has existed continuously henceforth until the merger with the Ministry of Sport in 2021.

List of ministers

References

External links
Official website – 
BIP website – 

Poland
Poland, Culture and National Heritage
Culture and National Heritage
Culture and National Heritage Ministers
Poland, Culture and National Heritage
Ministries established in 2005
2005 establishments in Poland